The Hagley Obelisk  (also known as the Wychbury Obelisk and locally as Wychbury Monument) stands close to the summit of Wychbury Hill in Hagley, Worcestershire, approximately  from the border with the West Midlands.  Visible for miles around, and accessible from public footpaths, it was for a while connected with a murder victim discovered on the nearby Lyttelton estate.

History 
The obelisk is a Grade II* listed building. It was commissioned as a landscape feature in 1758 by an illegitimate half-brother of the Lyttelton family at nearby Hagley Hall - Admiral Thomas Smith, who himself lived below the hill at Rockingham Hall.

There was much debate for decades over whether the eventually disintegrating structure should be demolished for safety reasons, but the consensus was that time and weather should be allowed to do the job until its restoration could be funded. It was formerly on the English Heritage list of the most endangered listed buildings until in 2010 conservation work was begun to repair it with funding aid from Natural England's Higher Level Stewardship scheme and Viscount Cobham. This involved it being largely deconstructed and rebuilt. By 2011 the obelisk had been fully restored, and included a time capsule made up of a local newsletter, a badge of the local Guild, and instructions on how to rebuild the Obelisk.

Since at least the 1970s the obelisk has been sporadically defaced with graffiti asking "Who put Bella in the Wych Elm?", a reference to an unsolved World War II-era mystery in which the decomposed body of a woman was found in a nearby wood.

Notes

References

External links

Wychbury Obelisk
Wychbury Obelisk Photos
An aerial photograph of Wychbury Hill & Obelisk

1758 establishments in England
Obelisks in England
Monuments and memorials in Worcestershire
Buildings and structures completed in 1758
Hagley Hall